Guillermo Cosío Vidaurri (born in Guadalajara, Jalisco, Mexico; September 4, 1929 – November 13, 2019) was a Mexican diplomat and politician who served as municipal president of Guadalajara (1971–1973), Governor of Jalisco and as a Deputy and Federal Representative (1976–1979). He also served as Ambassador of Mexico to Guatemala.

References

1929 births
2019 deaths
Governors of Jalisco